was a village located in Minamitsuru District, Yamanashi Prefecture, Japan.

As of 2003, the village had an estimated population of 2,306 and a density of 51.09 persons per km². The total area was 45.14 km².

On February 13, 2005, Akiyama was merged with the former town of Uenohara (from Kitatsuru District), to create the city of Uenohara.

External links
 Uenohara official website 

Dissolved municipalities of Yamanashi Prefecture